Gerry Storey MBE (born 1936, Belfast, Northern Ireland) is a boxing trainer who has coached the Irish Olympic Boxing Team on four occasions.

Storey is the head coach of the Holy Family Boxing Club in North Belfast. Storey and the club were featured in the BBC documentary Fight Town in 2003, and the club also appeared in the Daniel Day-Lewis film The Boxer. As a professional boxer, Storey won a British Championships title. Storey has trained many boxers including Hugh Russell, Neil Sinclair,  Barry McGuigan, Paddy Barnes and Carl Frampton.

McGuigan was training by Storey from the age of 14 through to his Olympic and Commonwealth bids, and claims Storey's club is the "most successful boxing club in the country". Storey's son Sammy is also an accomplished amateur boxer who competed in the 1984 Summer Olympics and the 1986 Commonwealth Games.

Storey's work has helped to bridge the sectarian divide in Belfast, as he trains both Catholics and Protestants. During the 1981 Irish hunger strike he was asked by Loyalist and Republican prisoners to oversee boxing training in the Maze Prison gymnasium. As a result of his work he won the Sport For Good award at the Laureus World Sports Awards in Estoril, Portugal on 16 May 2005.  Storey received his award from Barry McGuigan and Marvin Hagler, and was the first Irish sportsperson to win a Laureus award. Storey was honoured by the Irish Amateur Boxing Association for his contribution to the sport in Dublin on 2 February 2007.

Storey was appointed Member of the Order of the British Empire (MBE) in the 2008 New Year Honours, "for services to Boxing in Northern Ireland".

References

External links
Gerry Storey - Boxing for Peace

Laureus World Sports Awards winners
Living people
Members of the Order of the British Empire
Boxers from Belfast
1936 births
Irish male boxers